Ugi Island, also Uki Island (or Uki Ni Masi), is an island in Solomon Islands; it is located in Makira-Ulawa Province and lies 11 km north of Makira Island.

Geography
Ugi Island is a raised coral reef about 10.5 km long and 6.5 km wide. The island has a pleasant climate and good beaches.

Fauna
The only mammals that live there were introduced by humans like the Polynesian rat (Rattus exulans) and bats Dobsonia inermis, Pteropus cognatus, Emballonura nigrescens and Aselliscus tricuspidatus.

Village
At the census of population on November 23, 2009, the island had a population of 1,212. Most people live next to Selwyn Bay on the western side of the island. The principal village is Pawa, located at Selwyn Bay on the west coast. Archaeological evidence has demonstrated continuous occupation of the island since 1470 AD. The All Hallows' (senior primary) boys' boarding school was established at Ugi Island on 9 June 1922 by the Diocese of Melanesia as a replacement for St. Barnabas' School on Norfolk Island. What was left of the school was operated as a Diocese of Melanesia primary school until it was handed over to the Solomon government in 1975 to become a provincial secondary school.

References

Islands of the Solomon Islands